The Diocese of North East India is a diocese of the Church of North India, centred in Shillong, North-East India.

The Diocese of Assam, of the (Anglican) Church of India, Burma and Ceylon, was created from the Diocese of Calcutta in 1915. In 1970, it became a diocese of the united Church of North India; and had its current name by 1986.

Bishops of Assam
The Church of India, Burma and Ceylon diocese had three bishops prior to Indian independence:
1915–1924: Herbert Pakenham-Walsh (1871–1959)
1924–1945: George Hubback (1882–1955)
1946–1948: Nirod Biswas
and three after:
1949–1962: Joseph Amritanand
1963–1967: Eric Samuel Nasir
1968–1970: Ariel Victor Jonathan

Bishops of North East India
1970–1986: D. D. Pradhan, Bishop of Assam
1986–1998: Ernest William Talibuddin
1999aft. 2015: Purely Lyngdoh
c. 2017present: Michael Herenz

References

 
1915 establishments in India
Church of India, Burma and Ceylon
Church of North India
Anglican dioceses in Asia